Prüstel GP is a motorcycle racing team based in Oberlungwitz, Saxony, Germany. The team competes in the Moto3 World Championship under the name CFMoto Racing Prüstel GP.

History
The team was founded in 2008 by Dirk Heidolf and named Racing Team Germany. Then, it was taken over by Ingo Prüstel and his son Florian in 2016.

Prüstel GP rider Jason Dupasquier died in an accident during qualifying for the 2021 Italian motorcycle Grand Prix.

Results

† – Rider deceased
Notes
* Season still in progress.

References

External links
 

Motorcycle racing teams
Motorcycle racing teams established in 2008
2008 establishments in Germany